The Bishop of Chester is the Ordinary of the Church of England Diocese of Chester in the Province of York.

The diocese extends across most of the historic county boundaries of Cheshire, including the Wirral Peninsula and has its see in the City of Chester where the seat is located at the Cathedral Church of Christ and the Blessed Virgin Mary, which was formerly the Benedictine Abbey of Saint Werburgh, being elevated to cathedral status in 1541. The Bishop's residence is Bishop's House, Chester.

Cheshire previously held a bishopric from 1075 when the seat was at the collegiate church of St John the Baptist until 1102. The present diocese was formed in 1541 under King Henry VIII. Mark Tanner's election as Bishop of Chester was confirmed on 15 July 2020.

Earliest times 

Chester at various periods in its history had a bishop and a cathedral, though till the early sixteenth century only intermittently. Even before the Norman conquest the title Bishop of Chester is found in documents applied to prelates who would be more correctly described as Bishop of Mercia or even Bishop of Lichfield. After the Council of London in 1075 had decreed the transfer of all episcopal sees to cities, Peter, Bishop of Lichfield, removed his seat from Lichfield to Chester, and became known as Bishop of Chester. There he chose as his cathedral collegiate church of Saint John the Baptist, an arrangement which continued until 1102.

The next bishop, however, transferred the see to Coventry on account of the rich monastery there, though he retained the episcopal palace at Chester. The Diocese of Coventry and Lichfield was of enormous extent, and it was probably found convenient to have something analogous to a cathedral at Chester, even though the cathedral itself was elsewhere; accordingly we find that the church of St John ranked as a cathedral for a considerable time, and had its own dean and chapter of secular canons down to the time of the Reformation. But the chief ecclesiastical foundation in Chester was the Benedictine monastery of St Werburgh, the great church of which finally became the Cathedral Church of Christ and the Blessed Virgin Mary. The site had been occupied even during the Christian period of the Roman occupation by a church dedicated to Ss. Peter and Paul, and rededicated to St Werburgh and St Oswald during the Saxon period. The church was served by a small chapter of secular canons until 1093, when Hugh, Earl of Chester, converted it into a great Benedictine monastery, with the co-operation of St Anselm, then Prior of Bec, who sent Richard, one of his monks, to be the first abbot. A new Norman church was built by him and his successors.

This monastery, though suffering loss of property both by the depredations of the Welsh and the inroads of the sea, prospered, and in the thirteenth, fourteenth, and fifteenth centuries the monks transformed their Norman church into a gothic building.

Tudor period 

The last of the abbots of Chester was John, or Thomas, Clark, who resigned his abbey, valued at £1,003 5s. 11d. per annum, to the king at the time of the Dissolution of the Monasteries.

In 1541 Henry VIII, without papal sanction, created six new episcopal sees, one of which was Chester. The archdeaconry of Chester, from the Diocese of Coventry and Lichfield, and that of Richmond, from York, were combined to form the new see, and it was laid down that the abbey church, now the cathedral, was to be served by a dean and six prebends, the former abbot becoming the first dean. At first the diocese was annexed to the Province of Canterbury, but by another Act of Parliament it was soon transferred to that of York. The first bishop was the Provincial of the Carmelites, John Bird, a doctor of divinity who had attracted the king's attention by his sermons preached against the pope's supremacy. Having already been rewarded by appointment as Bishop of Bangor, he was now translated to Chester. On the accession of Mary he was deprived as being a married man, and died as Vicar of Dunmow in 1556.

Despite the origins of the diocese, it was recognised by the Roman See for the space of Queen Mary's reign. George Cotes, Master of Balliol and Fellow of Magdalen College, Oxford, and lecturer in theology, was appointed bishop by the Roman See. In 1556 he was succeeded by Cuthbert Scott, an able theologian and Vice-Chancellor of Cambridge University. On the accession of Elizabeth I he was one of the four Roman Catholic bishops chosen to defend Roman Catholic doctrine at the conference at Westminster, and immediately after this he was sent to the Tower and was deprived in 1559. Being released on bail, he contrived to escape to the Continent. He died at Louvain, on 9 October 1564.

Subsequent centuries 

The present diocese covers most of the traditional county of Cheshire, including the Wirral Peninsula and has its see in the City of Chester where the seat is located at the Cathedral Church of Christ and the Blessed Virgin Mary, which was formerly the Benedictine Abbey of Saint Werburgh, being elevated to cathedral status in 1541.

List of bishops
List of bishops of Chester after the foundation of the modern diocese of Chester in 1541.

Earlier the midland diocese had for a time had its see at Chester, for which see List of the Bishops of the Diocese of Lichfield and its precursor offices.

Assistant bishops
Among those who have served as assistant bishops in the diocese have been:
19341948: Norman Tubbs, Archdeacon of Chester and Canon Residentiary until 1937, Dean of Chester thereafter; former Bishop in Tinnevelly and Bishop of Rangoon
19621965 (res.): Tom Greenwood, Vicar of Whitegate and former Bishop of Yukon

References
Notes

Bibliography

Haydn's Book of Dignities (1894) Joseph Haydn/Horace Ockerby, reprinted 1969
Whitaker's Almanack 1883 to 2004, Joseph Whitaker and Sons Ltd/A&C Black, London

External links

 Crockford's Clerical Directory – Listings

Chester
Chester
Bishops of Chester
1541 establishments in England